Vanessa Chantal Paradis  (born 22 December 1972) is a French singer, model, and actress. Paradis became a child star at the age of 14 with the international success of her single "Joe le taxi" (1987). At age 18, she was awarded France's highest honours as both a singer and an actress with the Prix Romy Schneider and the César Award for Most Promising Actress for Jean-Claude Brisseau's Noce Blanche, as well as the Victoires de la Musique for Best Female Singer for her album Variations sur le même t'aime. Her most notable films also include Élisa (1995) alongside Gérard Depardieu, Witch Way Love (1997) opposite Jean Reno, Une chance sur deux (1998) co-starring with Jean-Paul Belmondo and Alain Delon, Girl on the Bridge (1999), Heartbreaker (2010), Café de Flore (2011) and Yoga Hosers (2016), directed by Kevin Smith. Her tribute to Jeanne Moreau at the 1995 Cannes Film Festival during which they sang in duet "Le Tourbillon" became notable in French popular culture. In 2022, she was nominated for the Molière Award for Best Actress for her performance in the play Maman.

She has been a muse to numerous musicians and lyricists who each took one of her albums under their aegis, including Étienne Roda-Gil (1988), Serge Gainsbourg (1990), Lenny Kravitz (1992), Matthieu Chedid (2007), Benjamin Biolay (2013), Samuel Benchetrit and The Bees (2018). As a model, Paradis has appeared on more than 300 magazine covers worldwide including Vogue, Elle, Harper's Bazaar, Madame Figaro, Paris Match, Vanity Fair, Glamour, Premiere, and Marie Claire. 

Since 1991, she has been a spokesmodel for Chanel chosen by Karl Lagerfeld starting with the birdcage commercial "L'Esprit de Chanel" directed by Jean-Paul Goude. 

Paradis was made Officier (Officer) in the Ordre des Arts et des Lettres in 2011 and was named Chevalier (Knight) in the Ordre national de la Légion d'honneur in 2015.

Early life 
Paradis was born in Saint-Maur-des-Fossés, near Paris, to interior designers André and Corinne Paradis. As a child she enrolled in dance lessons, learnt the basics of piano and attended child model casting sessions. At the age of seven, Paradis appeared on the local television program L'École des fans, a talent show for child singers.

Career

1983–1991 

Paradis recorded her first single, "La Magie des surprises-parties", in 1983 and performed it in an Italian festival in 1985. Although not a hit, it paved the way for the song with which she became internationally famous, "Joe le taxi", in 1987 when she was 14.  It was number one in France for 11 weeks and, unusually for a song sung in French, was released in the United Kingdom, where it reached number three. It was taken from her first album M&J (for Marilyn & John) which placed 13th in France, but did not enter the British chart.

In March 1989, at age 16, she left high school to pursue her singing career. Paradis released the album Variations sur le même t'aime in 1990, containing a remake of the Lou Reed song "Walk on the Wild Side". The album was written by French composer Serge Gainsbourg, whom she met when she received the best singer award at Victoires de la Musique, on 4 February 1990.

In 1990, she won the César Award for Most Promising Actress for her role in Noce Blanche.

In 1991, Paradis promoted the fragrance Coco for Chanel. In the advertisement, she was covered in black feathers, portraying a bird swinging in a cage. The advert was shot by Jean-Paul Goude. Paradis spoke of her continued admiration of Chanel in 2010 saying, "The more I know them, the more I love Chanel."

1992–1996 
In 1992, Paradis moved to the United States to work with Lenny Kravitz, whom she was dating at the time. Paradis started working on a new album in English, a language she was now fluent in. Written and produced by Kravitz, the album, titled Vanessa Paradis, topped the French chart and briefly made the UK listings (number 45). One of the singles from it was "Be My Baby", which made number 5 in France and gave her another Top 10 hit in the UK, peaking at number six.

In March 1993, Paradis started her first international tour, the Natural High Tour; she performed in France, England and Canada. In February 1994, Live was released in France. In April 1994, Paradis filmed Élisa, under the direction of Jean Becker. Elisa was a big success in France, and was released internationally.

1997–2006 
In 1997, Paradis played in Un amour de sorcière with Jeanne Moreau and Jean Reno, before filming Une chance sur deux, with Alain Delon and Jean-Paul Belmondo. In March 1999, La fille sur le Pont, by Patrice Leconte was released. This movie was shot and released in black and white. In 2004, she promoted Chanel's new handbags called Ligne Cambon.

In 2005, she modeled for Chanel again for The New Mademoiselle handbag. In 2008, she modelled for Miu Miu. Meanwhile, she was included in the French children's album and concert Le Soldat Rose in 2006.

2007–present 
Paradis released a new album (Divinidylle) in 2007 which was released in the UK on 11 December (September in France). There are three versions (regular, limited edition, and the Christmas edition). She started the Divinidylle Tour in October. Some concerts were filmed and a DVD/CD of the tour was released. Paradis won two Les Victoires de la Musique awards for this album in February 2008. Some of her later projects are a greatest hits CD (Best of Vanessa Paradis), which includes the commercial jingle "I love Paris in the Springtime"; she also starred in the animated film Un monstre à Paris, released in 2010.

Canadian film director Jean-Marc Vallée cast Paradis in a starring role in his film Café de Flore, in which she plays the single mother of a child with Down syndrome in the 1960s. The film was released in 2011, and Paradis garnered a Genie Award for Best Actress in a Leading Role at the 2012 Genie Awards.

Paradis released an acoustic album in November 2010 entitled Une nuit à Versailles. The album was recorded at L'Opéra of the Palace of Versailles during her Vanessa Paradis Concert Acoustique Tour. She also released a set of DVDs in 2010 called Anthologie which collected rare live performances and interviews from 1987 to 2007.

In 2010 she became the face of Chanel's new lipstick, Rouge Coco. She also became the face of their new handbag line, Ranger.

Her 2011 international tour included performances in the United States, Canada, the United Kingdom, Europe and Turkey.

In May 2013, Paradis released a new album, Love Songs, a double LP produced by French singer and producer Benjamin Biolay. The first single, Love Song, was also written by Biolay. The second single was Les espaces et les sentiments. The third single, Mi Amor, was written by BB Brunes frontman Adrien Gallo. Other people that have contributed to the songwriting of the album include Mickey 3D frontman Mickaël Furnon, as well as Johnny Depp and Lily-Rose Depp.

In 2016, Paradis co-starred in Yoga Hosers with her daughter Lily-Rose, as a history teacher. The same year, she was a member of the main competition jury of the 2016 Cannes Film Festival.

In September 2021, Paradis made her theatre debut in the play Maman, written and directed by her husband, Samuel Benchetrit, at the Edouard VII theatre in Paris. For her performance in the play, she was nominated for the Molière Award for Best Actress in a Private Theatre.

Personal life 
At 15, Paradis started dating 26-year-old French singer Florent Pagny. They broke up in 1991. From 1991 to 1996, she was in a relationship with Lenny Kravitz, who also produced her 1992 self-titled album. She dated French actor Stanislas Merhar from 1997 to 1998.

From 1998 to 2012, Paradis was in a relationship with American actor Johnny Depp. They have a daughter, Lily-Rose Depp (born 1999) and a son John "Jack" Christopher Depp III (Jack Depp), born in 2002.

In May 2014, at a Chanel show in Dubai, Vanessa Paradis confirmed her relationship with French singer Benjamin Biolay. They broke up in May 2015. In November 2016, she began dating Samuel Benchetrit, who directed her in his fifth film, Dog. In June 2018, Paradis and Benchetrit married in the town of Saint-Simeon. Vanessa Paradis has a country estate nearby, and her late father owned a small restaurant in the quiet country commune.

Paradis's sister, Alysson Paradis, is also an actress.

Philanthropy 
Paradis has been a member of the Les Enfoirés charity ensemble since 1993.

Popular culture and trivia 

 In 1991, Paradis was approached by Calvin Klein to become the face of his new advertising campaign alongside Mark Wahlberg. She declined the offer, which made Klein's second choice, Kate Moss, famous.
 In 2001, Carla Bruni wrote several songs for Paradis, who found them too personal and encouraged Bruni to record them herself, resulting in the album Quelqu'un m'a dit released in 2002.
 In 2014, her song "Mi amor" was chosen for the TV advertising campaign for the Love Story fragrance from the house of Chloé directed by Mélanie Laurent.

Discography

Studio albums
 M&J (1988)
 Variations sur le même t'aime (1990)
 Vanessa Paradis (1992)
 Bliss (2000)
 Divinidylle (2007)
 Love Songs (2013)
 Les Sources (2018)

Concert tours
 Natural High Tour (1993)
 Bliss Tour (2001)
 Divinidylle Tour (2007–08)
 Vanessa Paradis Concert Acoustique Tour (2009–10)
 International Tour 2011 (2011)
 Love Songs Tour (2013) 
 Tournée les sources (2019)

Filmography

Theatre

Awards and nominations

References

External links 

 
 Vanessa Paradis at Universal Music
 
 

1972 births
20th-century French actresses
21st-century French actresses
Best Actress Genie and Canadian Screen Award winners
Child pop musicians
English-language singers from France
French child singers
French expatriates in the United States
French women guitarists
French female models
French film actresses
French women singer-songwriters
French voice actresses
Living people
People from Saint-Maur-des-Fossés
Wrasse Records artists
French women pop singers
Chevaliers of the Légion d'honneur
20th-century guitarists
21st-century guitarists
Most Promising Actress César Award winners
21st-century French women singers
Contemporary R&B singers
French rock singers
20th-century French women singers
Johnny Depp
French stage actresses
Singers from Paris
Actresses from Paris
Best Actress Jutra and Iris Award winners
20th-century women guitarists
21st-century women guitarists